The 5th Cavalry Corps was a cavalry corps in the Imperial Russian Army.

Part of
8th Army: (September 1, 1915 - October 15, 1916)
9th Army: (October 20, 1916 - June 8, 1917)
7th Army: 1917 (from June 16, 1917)
11th Army: (July 23 - October 18, 1917 and November 1 - December 1, 1917)

Commanders
Lieutenant General L. Wieliaszew (from November 1915)

References
 A. K. Zalesskij I mirowaja wojna. Prawitieli i wojennaczalniki. wyd. WECZE Moskwa 2000.

Corps of the Russian Empire